Mian Muhammad Atif is a Pakistani politician who had been a member of the Provincial Assembly of the Punjab from August 2018 till January 2023.

Political career

He was elected to the Provincial Assembly of the Punjab as a candidate of Pakistan Tehreek-e-Insaf from Constituency PP-132 (Nankana Sahib-II) in 2018 Pakistani general election.

References

Living people
Pakistan Tehreek-e-Insaf MPAs (Punjab)
Year of birth missing (living people)